Kyle Elihu Onstott (January 12, 1887 – June 3, 1966) was an American novelist, known for his best-selling novel Mandingo (1957), which deals with slavery on an Alabama plantation with the fictional name of Falconhurst in the 1830s. The book was made into a 1961 play and film of the same name, which was released in 1975.

Onstott was originally a dog breeder and judge in regional dog shows, living in California with his widowed mother in the early 1900s. He was a lifelong bachelor, but at age 40, he chose to adopt a 23-year-old college student, Philip, who had lost his own parents. Philip eventually married a woman named Vicky and the two remained close to Onstott for the rest of his life. Onstott dedicated Mandingo to Philip and Vicky.

Onstott began writing Mandingo when he was 65 years old. He based some of the events in the novel on "bizarre legends" he heard while growing up: tales of slave breeding and sadistic abuse of slaves. Having collaborated with his adopted son on a book about dog breeding, he decided to write a book that would make him rich. "Utilizing his [adopted] son's anthropology research on West Africa, he handwrote Mandingo and his son served as editor. Denlinger's, a small Virginia publisher, released it and it became a national sensation." He was invited to write an article for True: The Man's Magazine in 1959 about the horrors of slavery.

A sequel and a series of other novels followed, mostly written with Lance Horner. Outside the usual setting of their work was the 1966 novel Child of the Sun, recounting the scandalous reign of the homosexual Roman emperor Elagabalus.

Works
 Beekeeping as a Hobby (1941)
 The New Art of Breeding Better Dogs (1962, with Philip Onstott)
 Mandingo (1957)
 The Black Sun
 Child of the Sun (with Lance Horner)
 Falconhurst Fancy
 Flight to Falconhurst
 Master of Falconhurst
 The Tattooed Rood
 Drum (1962)
 Strange Harvest (with Ashley Carter)

References

External links

1966 deaths
1887 births
Novelists from Illinois
20th-century American novelists
American male novelists
Dog breeders
People from Du Quoin, Illinois
20th-century American male writers